Adriano Reginato (born 19 December 1937) is an Italian former footballer who played as a goalkeeper.

Career
Reginato began his career with Treviso in Serie C1 in 1961, later moving to Torino F.C. in 1963, spending two seasons with the club as their back-up keeper, and also making his Serie A debut during that time. In 1965, he moved to Vicenza for a season, alternating with Franco Luison as the club's starting goalkeeper, and helping the club to a 6th place in Serie A during the 1965–66 season, as well as a quarter-final finish in the Coppa Italia. He is mostly remembered for his time with Cagliari (1966–1973). As the team's starting keeper, he became one of Serie A's top keepers, and he established a new record of 712 consecutive minutes without conceding a goal in Serie A between the 1965–66 and the 1966–67 seasons, which was later broken by Dino Zoff, and subsequently, Sebastiano Rossi and Gianluigi Buffon. In his later career, as the team's backup goalkeeper behind Enrico Albertosi, he helped the team to win their first historic Scudetto during the 1969–70 Serie A season, without conceding a goal in his single league appearance, before retiring from professional Italian football in 1973.

Honours
Cagliari
Serie A: 1969–70

References

Italian footballers
Association football goalkeepers
Treviso F.B.C. 1993 players
Torino F.C. players
L.R. Vicenza players
Cagliari Calcio players
Serie A players
1937 births
Living people